Ophidion rochei is a fish species in the family Ophidiidae.

References
 

Ophidion (fish)
Fish described in 1902
Fish of the Pacific Ocean
Fish of East Asia
Fish of China
Fish of Japan
Taxa named by David Starr Jordan